Quinoxalinedione is an organic compound with the formula C6H4(NH)2(CO)2.  It is a colorless solid that is soluble in polar organic solvents. Quinoxalinediones are a family of related compounds sharing the same bicyclic core.  Various quinoxalinediones are drugs.

Synthesis and structure
Quinoxalinedione is produced by condensation of dimethyloxalate and o-phenylenediamine:
C2O2(OMe)2  +  C6H4(NH2)2   →   C6H4(NH)2(CO)2  +  2 MeOH
The compound exists in solution and the solid state predominantly as the diamide form.  Some reactions of the compound indicate a role for the diol tautomer.

Drugs based on quinoxalinediones
Quinoxalinediones act as antagonists of the AMPA, kainate, and/or NMDA receptors of the ionotropic glutamate receptor family. Examples include the following:

 ACEA-1011
 Becampanel
 CNQX
 DNQX
 Fanapanel (MPQX)
 Licostinel (ACEA-1021)
 NBQX
 PNQX
 YM90K
 Zonampanel

A drug closely related to the quinoxalinediones, but possessing a quinazoline-2,4-dione structure instead, is selurampanel.  Caroverine is another closely related drug to the above, but instead containing a quinoxaline-2-one structure.

References

Quinones
Quinoxalines
Lactams